Châtelperron is a commune in the central French department of Allier.

It is the location of the site known as La Grotte des Fées.

Population

See also
 Châtelperronian
Communes of the Allier department

References

Communes of Allier
Allier communes articles needing translation from French Wikipedia